Canneto Pavese is a comune (municipality) in the Province of Pavia in the Italian region of Lombardy, located about 45 km south of Milan and about 20 km southeast of Pavia.

Canneto Pavese borders the following municipalities: Broni, Castana, Cigognola, Montescano, Montù Beccaria, Stradella.

References

External links
 Official website

Cities and towns in Lombardy